Members of the New South Wales Legislative Council who served from 1880 to 1882 were appointed for life by the Governor on the advice of the Premier. This list includes members between the elections commencing on 17 November 1880 and the elections commencing on 30 November 1882. The President was Sir John Hay.

See also
Third Parkes ministry

Notes

References

 

Members of New South Wales parliaments by term
19th-century Australian politicians